Lycée Prince de Liège (LPL) is a Belgian international school in Gombe, Kinshasa, Democratic Republic of the Congo. It serves Francophone Belgians and other Francophones of the ages 2–21. It is a part of the Association of Belgian Schools Abroad, in French:  (AEBE).

Dutch-speaking Belgians in Kinshasa go to a separate school, Prins van Luik School.

History
It was established in September 1966. King Albert II of Belgium laid the cornerstone of the current campus, located on land purchased by the Belgian government. This campus opened in 1969.

Student body
In the 1972–1973 school year, it had up to 2,500 students. That number has never been reached ever after. As of 2015, the school had 894 students. In May 2018, it had 870 students.

See also

 Education in the Democratic Republic of the Congo
 List of international schools

References

Further reading
  Boutsen, Bruno. "Le lycée Prince de Liège comme un moyen" (Archive). La Libre. Monday 3 August 2009.

External links
  Lycée Prince de Liège

1966 establishments in the Democratic Republic of the Congo
Belgian international schools
Educational institutions established in 1966
Elementary and primary schools in the Democratic Republic of the Congo
International high schools
International schools in the Democratic Republic of the Congo
Schools in Kinshasa
Lukunga District
High schools and secondary schools in the Democratic Republic of the Congo